Jordan Balazovic (born September 17, 1998) is a Canadian professional baseball pitcher for the Minnesota Twins of Major League Baseball (MLB).

Career
Balazovic attended St. Martin Secondary School in Mississauga, Ontario. He was drafted by the Minnesota Twins in the fifth round of the 2016 Major League Baseball draft and he signed, forgoing his commitment to play college baseball at Auburn University.

Balazovic spent his first two professional seasons in 2016 and 2017 with the Gulf Coast Twins, posting a 1.97 ERA and a 4.91 ERA, respectively. He spent 2018 with the Cedar Rapids Kernels, going 7-3 with a 3.94 ERA in 12 games (11 starts), and returned there to begin 2019 before being promoted to the Fort Myers Miracle. In July, he represented the Twins in the 2019 All-Star Futures Game. Over 19 games (18 starts) with Cedar Rapids and Fort Myers, he pitched to an 8-5 record and a 2.69 ERA, striking out 129 over  innings. In July and August he played for team Canada in the 2019 Pan American Games.

Balazovic did not play in a game in 2020 due to the cancellation of the minor league season because of the COVID-19 pandemic. The Twins added Balazovic to their 40-man roster after the 2020 season.

Balazovic spent the 2021 season with the Double-A Wichita Wind Surge, recording a 5-4 record and 3.62 ERA with 102 strikeouts in 97.0 innings pitched across 20 starts. He pitched in 22 games (21 starts) for the Triple-A St. Paul Saints in 2022, but struggled to an 0-7 record and 7.39 ERA with 76 strikeouts in 70.2 innings pitched.

On February 11, 2023, Balazovic suffered a broken jaw after being struck twice by a stranger and had his jaw wired shut. On March 3, Balazovic was optioned to Triple-A St. Paul to begin the season.

References

External links

1998 births
Living people
Baseball people from Ontario
Baseball pitchers
Baseball players at the 2019 Pan American Games
Canada national baseball team players
Canadian expatriate baseball players in the United States
Cedar Rapids Kernels players
Fort Myers Miracle players
Gulf Coast Twins players
Pan American Games medalists in baseball
Pan American Games silver medalists for Canada
Sportspeople from Mississauga
Wichita Wind Surge players
Medalists at the 2019 Pan American Games
St. Paul Saints players
Fort Myers Mighty Mussels players